Camphor is a Michelin Guide-starred restaurant in Los Angeles, in the U.S. state of California. According to Variety, the business "marries French technique with South Asian influences".

References 

Restaurants in Los Angeles